Scratchie Records was an independent record label founded in 1995 by James Iha and D'arcy Wretzky (ex-The Smashing Pumpkins), Adam Schlesinger (Fountains of Wayne, Ivy), Kerry Brown (ex-Catherine) and Jeremy Freeman.

Initially, Scratchie was based in Chicago and had distribution through Mercury Records, but a year of legal wrangling ended the pact after Universal merged with Mercury's parent company, Polygram. Scratchie then signed a deal with New Line and moved to New York City.

Selected artists 

Eszter Balint
The Blank Theory
Blaze
Dan Bryk
Catherine
Chainsaw Kittens
Fondly
Fountains of Wayne
The Frogs
Freak Magnet
Pancho Krystal
Fulflej
Albert Hammond Jr.
Mike Ladd
Midnight Movies
Office
Robbers on High Street
The Sights
The Sounds

See also 
 List of record labels

References 

Record labels established in 1995
American independent record labels
Alternative rock record labels
Companies based in Chicago
Vanity record labels